The 2014–15 season will be Győri ETO FC's 71st competitive season, 55th consecutive season in the OTP Bank Liga and 110th year in existence as a football club.

First team squad

Transfers

Summer

In:

Out:

Winter

In:

Out:

List of Hungarian football transfers summer 2014
List of Hungarian football transfers winter 2014–15

Statistics

Appearances and goals
Last updated on 9 December 2014.

|-
|colspan="14"|Youth players:

|-
|colspan="14"|Players no longer at the club:

|}

Top scorers
Includes all competitive matches. The list is sorted by shirt number when total goals are equal.

Last updated on 9 December 2014

Disciplinary record
Includes all competitive matches. Players with 1 card or more included only.

Last updated on 9 December 2014

Overall
{|class="wikitable"
|-
|Games played || 31 (17 OTP Bank Liga, 2 Europa League, 4 Hungarian Cup and 8 Hungarian League Cup)
|-
|Games won || 13 (6 OTP Bank Liga, 1 Europa League, 3 Hungarian Cup and 3 Hungarian League Cup)
|-
|Games drawn || 7 (5 OTP Bank Liga, 0 Europa League, 0 Hungarian Cup and 2 Hungarian League Cup)
|-
|Games lost || 11 (6 OTP Bank Liga, 1 Europa League, 1 Hungarian Cup and 3 Hungarian League Cup)
|-
|Goals scored || 50
|-
|Goals conceded || 42
|-
|Goal difference || +8
|-
|Yellow cards || 69
|-
|Red cards || 3
|-
|rowspan="1"|Worst discipline ||  Máté Pátkai (8 , 1 )
|-
|rowspan="3"|Best result || 4–1 (A) v Gyirmót – Ligakupa – 16 September 2014
|-
| 4–1 (H) v Csákvár – Ligakupa – 7 October 2014
|-
| 3–0 (A) v Pécs – OTP Bank Liga – 8 November 2014
|-
|rowspan="1"|Worst result || 0–3 (H) v Göteborg – UEFA Europa League – 17 July 2014
|-
|rowspan="3"|Most appearances ||  Máté Pátkai (23 appearances)
|-
|  Gergely Rudolf (23 appearances)
|-
|  Ádám Lang (23 appearances)
|-
|rowspan="1"|Top scorer ||  Giorgi Kvilitaia (10 goals)
|-
|Points || 46/93 (49.46%)
|-

Nemzeti Bajnokság I

Matches

Classification

Results summary

Results by round

Hungarian Cup

League Cup

Group stage

Knockout phase

Europa League

The First and Second Qualifying Round draws took place at UEFA headquarters in Nyon, Switzerland on 23 June 2014.

References

External links
 Eufo
 Official Website
 UEFA
 fixtures and results

Győri ETO FC seasons
Hungarian football clubs 2014–15 season